Du Xiujie (born 5 November 1971) is a Chinese sprinter. She competed in the women's 200 metres at the 1996 Summer Olympics.

References

External links
 

1971 births
Living people
Athletes (track and field) at the 1996 Summer Olympics
Chinese female sprinters
Olympic athletes of China
Place of birth missing (living people)
Universiade medalists in athletics (track and field)
Universiade gold medalists for China
Medalists at the 1995 Summer Universiade
Olympic female sprinters
20th-century Chinese women